Sugiez railway station is a railway station in the municipality of Mont-Vully, in the Swiss canton of Fribourg. It is an intermediate stop on the standard gauge Fribourg–Ins line of Transports publics Fribourgeois.

Services
 the following services stop at Sugiez:

 RER Fribourg  / :

References

External links 
 
 

Railway stations in the canton of Fribourg
Transports publics Fribourgeois stations